Ough is a four-letter sequence, a tetragraph, used in English orthography and notorious for its unpredictable pronunciation. It has at least eight pronunciations in North American English and nine in British English, and no discernible patterns exist for choosing among them.

History

In Middle English, ough was regularly pronounced with a back rounded vowel and a velar fricative (e.g.,  or ).

Most common pronunciations

 as in though (cf. toe).
 as in through (cf. true).
 as in rough (cf. ruffian).
 as in thought (cf. taut).
 as in bough (cf.  cow)

List of pronunciations 

Slough has three pronunciations, depending on its meaning:
  (for the noun meaning a skin shed by an animal, and for the verb derived from it)
  (for the noun meaning a muddy area, and for the verb derived from it. Also for the noun meaning a state of depression)
  (alternative American pronunciation for the noun meaning a muddy area, and for the verb derived from it)

An example sentence using the nine pronunciations commonly found in modern usage (and excluding hough, which is now a rarely used spelling) is, "The wind was rough along the lough as the ploughman fought through the snow, and though he hiccoughed and coughed, his work was thorough."

Another, slightly shorter example would be, "The rough, dough-faced ploughman fought through the borough to the lough, hiccoughing and coughing."

Other pronunciations can be found in proper nouns, many of which are of Celtic origin (Irish, Scottish or Welsh) rather than English.

Additionally, three parishes of Milton Keynes—Woughton , Loughton  and Broughton —all have different pronunciations of the combination.

Tough, though, through and thorough are formed by adding another letter each time, yet none of them rhyme. 

Some humorous verses have been written to illustrate this seeming incongruity:
 "A rough-coated, dough-faced ploughman strode, coughing and hiccoughing, thoughtfully through the streets of Scarborough."
 "O-U-G-H" by Charles Battell Loomis
 "Ough, a Phonetic Fantasy" by William Thomas Goodge
 "I take it you already know" by T. S. Watt
 "Enough Is Enough" by Rosemary Chen

Spelling reforms 
Because of the unpredictability of the combination, many English spelling reformers have proposed replacing it with more phonetic combinations, some of which have caught on in varying degrees of formal and informal success. Generally, spelling reforms have been more widely accepted in the United States and less so in other English-speaking areas. One problem is that a pronunciation with the velar fricative is still found locally in parts of North-East Scotland, where, for example, trough is pronounced .

In April 1984, at its yearly meeting, the Simplified Spelling Society adopted the following reform as its house style:

Shorten  to  when it is sounded as : through → thru.
Shorten  to  when it is sounded as : though → tho (but doh for dough).
Shorten  to  when it is sounded as : bough → bou, drought → drout, plough → plou.
Change  to  when it is sounded as : bought → baut, ought → aut, thought → thaut.
Change  to  when it is sounded as : cough → cof.
Change  to  when it is sounded as : enough → enuf, tough → tuf.

Already standard 
hiccup instead of the folk etymology hiccough
hock instead of hough (this word is rare in the United States)
plow instead of plough (standard in American English)

In early colonial America, John Smith used the spelling raugroughcum for the animal that is today known as the raccoon. This was a new animal to the explorers and, alongside the tribal name Quiyoughcohannock, shows that the ough combination was still being used to coin new words in early colonial America.

Already varyingly formal 
In the UK, the word dough can also be pronounced , a pronunciation remembered in the spelling of the word duffpudding. "And Wilderness is Paradise enow.").

The following spellings are generally considered unacceptable in other areas, but are standard in the United States:
naught instead of nought (standard in the United States, although the word is only used in phrases such as "all for naught") – some archaic uses of nought have been replaced with not
plow instead of plough (standard in the United States and Canada, with plough being occasionally used to refer to the horsedrawn variety)
slew or sluff instead of the two corresponding pronunciations of slough (the former is very common in the United States, the latter much less so, with slough being retained in most cases)
donut instead of doughnut

Common informal 
thru instead of through: it is a common abbreviated spelling in the US and standard on road signs, where it conserves space and is quicker to read: e.g., "drive thru" for drive-through and "thru traffic" for "through traffic" 
tho and altho instead of though and although (sometimes contracted as  tho' and  altho')
'nuff instead of enough
However, all of these are considered unacceptable in written British English and formal American English, except in the most casual and informal forms of textual conversation.

Rare informal 
coff instead of cough – Koffing
laff instead of laugh (British comic variant larf) – Laffy Taffy
enuff or enuf instead of enough – Tuff Enuff
tuff instead of tough – Tuff Enuff, Tuff Shed
ruff instead of rough (seldom used because it often refers to an onomatopoeia for a dog's bark)

Comparable combinations 
 as in caught, daughter, fraught, slaughter
 as in draught (US draft), laugh, laughter

The similar  yields at least four standard pronunciations, although one is only found in a word derived from a proper name:
 as in bow (stoop), bowdlerize (derived from Thomas Bowdler, also ), cow, glower (glare), now, owl, row (fight), sow (pig), town, etc.
 as in bow (weapon), bowl, crow, know, lower (let down), own, row (bank), sow (plant), etc.
 as in acknowledge , knowledge 
 as in bowie knife  (named after Jim Bowie)

Dialectal forms also render pronunciations such as fella , tomorra  for fellow , tomorrow , and winder , yeller  for window , yellow .

 as in bomb  (rhymes with Tom)
 as in clomb , comb  (rhymes with home)
 as in tomb , womb  (rhymes with gloom)
 as in aplomb  (rhymes with gum, also )
 as in buncombe , coxcombry 

 as in combat , rhombus , somber (UK sombre) , wombat , zombie , etc.
 as in Colombia 
 as in combine (verb) 
—but not, for example, in bomber, comber, entombing, etc.

The group  also has a wide variety of pronunciations, in part because of the two phonemes ( and ) represented by English . Here are seven different pronunciations:
 as in both, loth, lothario, quoth, sloth (UK), troth
 as in apothecary, broth, brothel, cloth, froth, Goth, hypothesis, moth, sloth (US)
 as in nothing
 as in behemoth, mammoth
 as in betroth
 as in bother
 as in another, brother, mother, other, smother

 as in long, prong, song, strong, thong, tong, wrong
 as in congress, longer, Mongol
 as in congee, longevity, longitude, pongee
 as in among, tongue
 as in humongous, monger, mongrel
 as in allonge, sponge
 as in congratulate
 as in congeal, congest
 as in mongoose, ongoing (some pronunciations)

Curiosities
Among the smaller villages and hamlets in Milton Keynes (England) are three Broughton, Loughton and Woughton on the Green that are of note in that their names each use a different pronunciation of the 'ough' letter sequence.

Notes and references 

Latin-script tetragraphs
English orthography